Jackson College is a public college in Jackson County, Michigan. Originally established as Jackson Junior College in 1928, Jackson County electors voted to reincorporate the institution as a community college district under the "Public Act 188 of 1955" in 1962. In 1964 voters approved a charter millage that continues to indefinitely fund the college. In June 2013, the board of trustees approved an official name change from Jackson Community College to Jackson College.

Jackson College has been accredited by the Higher Learning Commission since 1933 and offers 48 associate degrees, certificate programs, and transfer options to Jackson County and Michigan residents. Today, the college has a yearly enrollment of nearly 8,000 students between its several locations; Central Campus located in Summit Township, the Flight Center at the Jackson County Airport, the William Maher campus on the north side of town near Interstate 94 (I-94), JC @ LISD TECH (vocational-technical school) in Adrian, and the LeTarte Hillsdale Center in Hillsdale, as well as online programs.

Jackson College's Central Campus offers student housing facilities, becoming one of only a handful of community colleges in Michigan to offer student housing. The college provides a variety of Division II athletic programs, including basketball, baseball, softball, soccer, bowling, cross country and golf.

History 
Jackson College was founded as Jackson Junior College in 1928 and operated as a division of the Jackson Public Schools. Voters agreed to make it a separate entity in 1962, and the name changed to Jackson Community College in 1965. In June 2013, the school's board of directors approved a name change to Jackson College. Daniel Phelan, president of the college, noted that the word "community" was removed to reflect the highest degree offered by the college. Trustees also set a budget of $50,000 on rebranding all items bearing the college's name and logo.

Campuses 
Jackson college currently operates 4 campuses in and around the Jackson area. Central Campus is the primary and largest JC campus of the 4 locations. Most of the colleges academic and administrative buildings/offices are located on Central Campus. This includes the Jackson College Potter Center. The Potter Center at Jackson College is the most versatile and complete performing arts complex in the area.
 Central Campus
 JC @ LISD TECH
 Hillsdale LeTarte Center
 W.J. Maher Campus
 Jackson Flight Center

Student Housing 
Located on the Jackson College Central Campus, there are currently 3 student residence buildings; CV1 (Campus View 1) built in 2007, CV2 (Campus View 2) built in 2009, and CV3 (Campus View 3) the newest of the 3 and was built in 2015. CV1 and CV2 are both located on the southeast corner of campus, while CV3 is located on the south side of campus.

Satellite Programs 
The Clyde LeTarte Hillsdale Center opened in 1991. Prior to this Jackson College had offered classes through Hillsdale High School's adult education program. The LeTarte Hillsdale Center offers classes in allied health fields, business, criminal justice, graphic design, nursing and many courses that are aimed at students seeking to earn credits for transfer to a 4-year college.

JC @ LISD TECH is located in Adrian, Michigan and serves students in Lenawee County and nearby areas. The 27,000-square-foot facility is located next to the Lenawee LISD TECH Center and features modern technology, classroom spaces, science wing, full-service bookstore, and a bistro.

References

External links 

 

Two-year colleges in the United States
Education in Jackson County, Michigan
Community colleges in Michigan
Michigan Community College Athletic Association
Educational institutions established in 1928
Buildings and structures in Jackson County, Michigan
NJCAA athletics
1928 establishments in Michigan